Kraszewo may refer to the following places:
Kraszewo, Masovian Voivodeship (east-central Poland)
Kraszewo, Pomeranian Voivodeship (north Poland)
Kraszewo, Działdowo County in Warmian-Masurian Voivodeship (north Poland)
Kraszewo, Lidzbark County in Warmian-Masurian Voivodeship (north Poland)